Bautista Salvador Etcheverry Boggio (December 2, 1931 – April 18, 2015) was a Uruguayan Ambassador.
He was a member of the Board of Directors of the Federación de Asociaciones Educativas Privadas de América Latina y el Caribe and Regional Director for Uruguay.

Career
He was employed as teacher and Inspector of one of the Departments of Uruguay.
In the end of 1960 he became Deputy Inspector of the Presidency of the Consejo Nacional de Enseñanza Primaria y Normal of Uruguay 
In 1973 he was employed as Director General de Educación Primaria.
In 1977 he became Deputy Representative of Uruguay to the Organization of American States.
From  to 1984 he was the Uruguayan Ambassador in Israel.
After the Jerusalem Law passed by the Knesset on July 30, 1980 and was enacted by Yitzhak Navon the Uruguayan Embassy was moved from Jerusalem to Tel Aviv.

Publication 
Instituciones de atención de menores y de reeducación de jóvenes y adultos, en México, Estados Unidos de Norte América y Puerto Rico.

References

1931 births
2015 deaths
Ambassadors of Uruguay to Israel